The Medical Practitioners Tribunal Service (MPTS) is a tribunal in the United Kingdom that adjudicates on complaints made against doctors, making independent decisions about their fitness to practise. This includes imposing sanctions for decisions about violations of ethical principles.

Background
One of the recommendations in the fifth report of The Shipman Inquiry, which was published in December 2004, was for the adjudication stage of fitness to practise procedures to be undertaken by a body that is independent of the General Medical Council (GMC). In 2007 the UK Government released a white paper on The Regulation of Health Professionals. In late 2010 the Department of Health consulted on plans to create a body that was separate from the health regulators, to adjudicate on fitness to practise matters.

On 2 December 2010, the government announced that they had decided not to proceed with an Office of the Health Professions Adjudicator (OHPA).

In July 2011, the GMC approved proposals to separate its presentation of fitness to practise cases from their adjudication. The adjudication would become the responsibility of a new body, the Medical Practitioners Tribunal Service.

History
In June 2012 the MPTS assumed responsibility for medical tribunals, with their panels given the power to remove or suspend a doctor's ability to work within the UK. It was expected that the service would handle some 340 doctors’ fitness-to-practise hearings a year. The MTPS was located in a dedicated hearing centre in Manchester which has 16 hearing rooms.

There were changes in the records kept, with the use of digital recordings, instead of shorthand writers. Specialist advisers were used less often, only in exceptional circumstances.

In March 2015, changes to the Medical Act mean that the GMC gained the ability to appeal against decisions made by the MPTS.

In 2014 legislation was introduced the GMC gained powers around demanding proof of competence in English from doctors coming from within the EU. In October of the following year, the first doctors from the EU were disciplined following inadequate performances in tests that the MTPS itself had requested.

Chair
David Pearl became the first Chair of the Medical Practitioners Tribunal Service on 11 June 2012, after being appointed through an independent process in February of that year. Caroline Swift succeeded him as chair in August 2016.

References

External links
 

2012 establishments in the United Kingdom
Organizations established in 2012
Medical regulation in the United Kingdom